Werribee railway station is the terminus of the electrified suburban Werribee line in Victoria, Australia. It serves the western Melbourne suburb of Werribee, and it opened on 25 June 1857.

The Western standard gauge line, which operates between Melbourne and Adelaide, passes to the north of Platform 1.

History

Werribee station opened on 25 June 1857 by the Geelong and Melbourne Railway Company, as part of the railway line between those two cities. It was designed by Frederick Kawerau, in partnership with Edward Snell, the engineer for the Geelong and Melbourne Railway Company. In May 1927, the station building was heavily damaged by fire. As part of the rebuilding, a new, low-pitched roof was provided, and the surviving bluestone walls were cement rendered. A stone plaque, embossed with "G.&M.R. 1857", was once on the south gable, but was lost after the fire. It has since been found, and has been built into the wall of the former Victorian Railways printing works in Laurens Street, North Melbourne.

In 1963, boom barriers replaced hand gates at the former Cherry Street level crossing, which was located at the Up end of the station. In 1968, the line between Werribee and Laverton was duplicated, with duplication to Little River occurring in 1970. In 1973, all interlocking at the station was abolished, with a signal panel provided. In 1976, boom barriers replaced hand gates at the former Werribee Street level crossing, which was located nearby in the Down direction of the station. On 11 October 1979, a Seymour-Geelong goods train derailed at the station, causing extensive damage to both platforms and the station building on Platform 2 (now Platform 3).

In April 1983, the current island platform and underpass was provided. In November of that year, the line from Newport to Werribee was electrified. In 1987, sidings "B", "E" and "F" were abolished.

In 1997, Werribee was upgraded to a Premium Station.

On 27 June 2019, the Level Crossing Removal Project announced that the Cherry Street level crossing will be grade separated, with a road overpass built approximately 1km east of the station, connecting Tarneit Road with the Princes Highway. Construction began in February 2020 and, on 11 March 2021, the overpass was opened to traffic. The Cherry Street level crossing was closed to traffic on the same day, and was replaced with a pedestrian and cyclist underpass, which opened on 1 April of that year.

As part of stage 1 of the Western Rail Plan's Geelong Fast Rail project, Werribee is scheduled to be upgraded. Construction is set to begin in 2023.

Platforms and services

Werribee has one side platform and one island platform with two faces. It is serviced by Metro Trains' Werribee line services.

Platform 1:
  all stations and limited express services to Flinders Street and Frankston

Platform 2:
  all stations and limited express services to Flinders Street and Frankston

Platform 3:
  all stations and limited express services to Flinders Street and Frankston

Until June 2015, V/Line Geelong and Warrnambool line services operated via Werribee, with many of the services stopping at the station. The Melbourne-bound services used Platform 2, while Geelong-bound services used Platform 3. These services now operate via the Regional Rail Link.

Transport links

CDC Melbourne operates twelve routes to and from Werribee station, under contract to Public Transport Victoria:
 : to Williams Landing station
 : to Hoppers Crossing station
 : to Tarneit station
 : to Tarneit station
 : to Hoppers Crossing station
 : to Tarneit station
 : to Wyndham Vale station
 : to Jubilee Estate (Wyndham Vale)
 : to Wyndham Vale station
 : to Werribee South
 : to Riverwalk Estate (Werribee)
 : to Werribee station (loop service via South Werribee)

References

External links
 
 Melway map at street-directory.com.au

Premium Melbourne railway stations
Railway stations in Melbourne
Railway stations in Australia opened in 1857
Werribee, Victoria
Listed railway stations in Australia
Railway stations in the City of Wyndham